The People's Progressive Alliance (PPA) was a political party in Montserrat led by John Osborne.

History
The PPA was created in 1996 as a successor to the People's Liberation Movement, which had been formed by Osborne in 1973. Although it received the most votes in the November 1996 elections, it won only two of the seven seats in the Legislative Council, and a coalition government was formed by the  Movement for National Reconstruction (MNR) and the National Progressive Party.

In 2001 the party merged with the MNR to create the New People's Liberation Movement prior to the elections that year.

References

Defunct political parties in Montserrat
Political parties established in 1996
1996 establishments in Montserrat
Political parties disestablished in 2001
2001 disestablishments in Montserrat